Sadia Iqbal (born 5 August 1995) is a Pakistani cricketer who plays as a slow left-arm orthodox bowler. In October 2019, she was named in Pakistan's squad for their series against Bangladesh. She made her Women's Twenty20 International (WT20I) debut for Pakistan, against Bangladesh, on 26 October 2019. She made her Women's One Day International (WODI) debut for Pakistan, also against Bangladesh, on 2 November 2019.

In January 2020, she was named in Pakistan's squad for the 2020 ICC Women's T20 World Cup in Australia. In October 2021, she was named in Pakistan's team for the 2021 Women's Cricket World Cup Qualifier tournament in Zimbabwe. In May 2022, she was named in Pakistan's team for the cricket tournament at the 2022 Commonwealth Games in Birmingham, England.

References

External links
 
 

1995 births
Living people
Cricketers from Faisalabad
Pakistani women cricketers
Pakistan women One Day International cricketers
Pakistan women Twenty20 International cricketers
Faisalabad women cricketers
Higher Education Commission women cricketers
Cricketers at the 2022 Commonwealth Games
Commonwealth Games competitors for Pakistan